Edward Tyer (6 February 1830 - 25 December 1912) was an English railway engineer who developed the Tyer's Electric Train Tablet system widely used in the 19th and 20th centuries on single-track railways. He devised it after the Thorpe rail accident of 1874, which left 21 people dead.

He was also an astronomer.

See also

References  

 (Edward Tyer on Luxembourgish Wikipedia)

1830 births
1912 deaths
British railway pioneers
English electrical engineers
British railway civil engineers
19th-century British engineers
British astronomers